Gábor Koós (born 9 February 1986 in Budapest) is a retired Hungarian football (forward) player.

References 
HLSZ 
Nemzeti Sport 

1986 births
Living people
Footballers from Budapest
Hungarian footballers
Association football forwards
Budapest Honvéd FC players
BFC Siófok players
Rákospalotai EAC footballers
Budaörsi SC footballers
Szolnoki MÁV FC footballers
Egri FC players
Ceglédi VSE footballers
Soroksári TE footballers
Nemzeti Bajnokság I players